Koranteng is a surname. Notable people with the  surname include:

Eugene Koranteng (born 1988), Ghanaian Mobile and Blogger at Jobsforghana
Eugene Koranteng (born 1966), Ghanaian triple jumper
Isaac Dankyi-Koranteng (born 1977), Ghanaian businessman
Nathan Koranteng (born 1992), English footballer
Prince Koranteng Amoako (born 1973), Ghanaian footballer 
Samuel Koranteng-Pipim (born 1957), Ghanaian writer and theologian
Seth Koranteng, Ghanaian diplomat
Fredua Koranteng Adu (born 1989), Ghananian-American athlete

Surnames of Akan origin